Kadana is a village and tehsil in the Mahisagar district of the Indian state of Gujarat. It is situated on the riverbank of Mahi River. Kadana is the site of the Kadana Dam, which generates 240MW of hydroelectric power. The dam was built between 1979 and 1989 and is a part of Santrampur (Vidhan Sabha constituency). The construction of a new bridge over the Mahi river, near to the dam, started at the end of 2016.

Geography

Kadana borders other regions:
 to the south: Santrampur
 to the west: Khanpur
 to the east: Fatehpura
 to the north: Simalwara

Lunawada, Sagwara, Modasa and Godhra are large cities nearby Kadana Tehsil.

Demographics
As of the 2011 Census of India, Kadana had a population of 129,545, living in 19,815 houses. Of these, 66,399 were male and 63,146 were female.

Kadana comprises 132 villages and more than 200 sub-villages which incorporate into 38 Gram Panchyats.

Villages

Attractions
 Kadana Dam
 Eklingji Mahadev temple
 Pataleshwar Mahadev temple, located in Thakor Na Nathra
 Nadinath Mahadev temple, located in Ghodiyaar, near Kadana Dam
 Baba Ramdevpir Mandir temple, located at Vagh Dungri

Festival
All festival like Holi, Diwali, Navratri, Mahashivratri, Nagpuja, Id-ae-milad and mohrram are celebrated with enthusiasm and cheer.

Languages
Gujarati speak up by most of population but its variable according to local vocalisation
Hindi, English other languages spoken.

Historical Importance
Kadana, santrampur and surrounding villages once living place of various Rulers of middle India & ancient India.

References

1.http://mahisagardp.gujarat.gov.in/district-population-figure.htm

Cities and towns in Panchmahal district